The spotted crocias (Laniellus albonotatus) is a passerine bird in the family Leiothrichidae.
It is endemic to the island of Java in Indonesia, where it is confined to west Java.

This species was formerly placed in the genus Crocias but under the rules of the International Code of Zoological Nomenclature Laniellus Swainson, 1832 has priority over Crocias Temminck, 1836.

Its natural habitat is subtropical or tropical moist montane forests.
It is threatened by habitat loss.

References

Collar, N. J. & Robson, C. 2007. Family Timaliidae (Babblers)  pp. 70 – 291 in; del Hoyo, J., Elliott, A. & Christie, D.A. eds. Handbook of the Birds of the World, Vol. 12. Picathartes to Tits and Chickadees. Lynx Edicions, Barcelona.

spotted crocias
Birds of Java
spotted crocias